This is a list of islands of Malaysia. According to the Department of Survey and Mapping, Malaysia, there are 878 islands in the country. The state of Sabah has the most islands with 394 islands within its waters. Apart from that, Malaysia also has 510 offshore geographical features which include rocks, sandbanks and ridges. In 2015, it was reported that Malaysia still has over 535 unnamed islands, prompting the need for the government to take quick action to prevent neighbouring countries from taking over these islands. Most of the islands in the state of Sabah have been given a name, according to a statement from the State Land and Survey Department director.

Major islands

Islands over 250,000 square kilometres 
 Borneo (shared with Brunei and Indonesia)

Islands over 200 square kilometres 
 Banggi, Sabah
 Bruit, Sarawak
 Langkawi, Kedah
 Penang, Penang
 Sebatik, Sabah (shared with North Kalimantan, Indonesia)

Disputed islands 

 Spratly Islands (South China Sea Islands)

Minor islands

Islands below 200 square kilometres

 Aman, Penang
 Aur, Johor
 Batik, Sabah
 Balambangan, Sabah
 Berhala, Sabah
 Besar, Malacca
 Besar, Johor
 Betong, Penang
 Bidong, Terengganu
 Bodgaya, Sabah
 Bohayan, Sabah
 Boheydulang, Sabah
 Bum Bum, Sabah
 Burong, Malacca
 Carey, Selangor
 Daat, Labuan
 Dinawan, Sabah
 Dayang, Johor
 Dodol, Malacca
 Duyong, Terengganu
 Pulau Enoe, Sabah
 Gedung, Penang
 Gaya, Sabah
 Pulau Indah, Selangor
 Jambongan, Sabah
 Jerejak, Penang
 Kalumpang, Sabah
 Kapalai, Sabah
 Kapas, Terengganu
 Konet, Malacca
 Jarak, Perak
 Kalampunian, Sabah
 Kendi, Penang
 Pulau Ketam, Selangor
 Klang, Selangor
 Kukup, Johor
 Kuraman, Labuan
 Labuan, Labuan
 Lalang, Malacca
 Lang Tengah, Terengganu
 Lankayan, Sabah
 Layang Layang, Sabah
 Libaran, Sabah
 Ligitan, Sabah
 Lumut, Perak
 Mabul, Sabah
 Malawali, Sabah
 Manukan, Sabah
 Mengalum, Sabah
 Mamutik, Sabah
 Manukan, Sabah 
 Mantanani, Sabah
 Mataking, Sabah
 Montokud, Sabah
 Nangka, Malacca
 Pababag, Sabah
 Pangkor, Perak
 Panjang, Malacca
 Papan, Labuan
 Payar, Kedah
 Pemanggil, Johor
 Pisang, Johor
 Perak, Kedah
 Perhentian, Terengganu
 Pom Pom, Sabah
 Rawa, Johor
 Redang, Terengganu
 Rimau, Penang
 Rusa, Kelantan
 Sakar, Sabah
 Sapi, Sabah
 Sebatik, Sabah
 Selingan, Sabah
 Sepanggar, Sabah
 Serimbun, Malacca
 Sibu, Johor
 Big Simbu
 Centre Sibu
 Kukus Sibu
 Hujung Sibu
 Satang Sibu
 Sempadi Sibu
 Bawai sibu
 Talang-Talang sibu
 Sipadan, Sabah
 Sulug, Sabah
 Tabawan, Sabah
 Tengah, Johor
 Tenggol, Terengganu
 Tiga, Sabah
 Tigabu, Sabah
 Tikus, Penang
 Timbun Mata, Sabah
 Tinggi, Johor
 Tioman, Pahang
 Tukun Perak, Kedah
 Tukun Tengah, Perak
 Upeh, Malacca
 Undan, Malacca
 Wan Man, Terengganu

Artificial islands
 Forest City, Johor
 Gazumbo, Penang
 Malacca, Malacca
 Marina, Perak
 Seri Tanjung Pinang, Penang

Other island groups, conservation areas, and national parks
 Tunku Abdul Rahman National Park, Sabah
 Tun Sakaran Marine Park, Sabah
 Sugud Islands Marine Conservation Area, Sabah
 Turtle Islands National Park, Sabah
 Tanjung Datu National Park, Sarawak
 Talang Satang National Park, Sarawak

See also
 List of islands

References

Malaysia, List of islands of
 
Islands of Malaysia